The 2008 Chicago Cubs season was the 137th season of the Chicago Cubs franchise, the 133rd in the National League and the 93rd at Wrigley Field. The season began at home on March 31 against the Milwaukee Brewers. The Cubs were champions of the National League Central Division for the second year in a row, accumulating 97 regular season wins—the most since 1945. It was the first time since 1908 that the Cubs made postseason appearances in consecutive seasons.

At the All-Star break in July, the Cubs led the NL Central and were tied with the Los Angeles Angels of Anaheim for the best record in the major leagues. They tied a National League record with eight players selected to the All-Star team.

On September 20, the Cubs clinched the NL Central championship with a 5–4 win over the St. Louis Cardinals. Despite their regular season success, the team did not advance past the first round of the playoffs; they were swept 3–0 by the Los Angeles Dodgers in the National League Division Series.

Lou Piniella, in his second year as the Cubs' manager, won the National League's Manager of the Year Award in 2008. In addition, catcher Geovany Soto won the 2008 National League Rookie of the Year Award.

Regular season

Game log 

|- align="center" bgcolor="ffbbbb"
| 1 || March 31 || Brewers || 4 – 3 (10) || Gagné (1-0) || Howry (0-1) || Riske (1) || 41,089 || 0-1 || 
|-

|- align="center" bgcolor="ffbbbb"
| 2 || April 2 || Brewers || 8 – 2 || Suppan (1-0) || Lilly (0-1) || || 39,468 || 0-2 || 
|- align="center" bgcolor="bbffbb"
| 3 || April 3 || Brewers || 6 – 2 || Dempster (1-0) || Bush (0-1) || Wood (1) || 37,973 || 1-2 || 
|- align="center" bgcolor="ffbbbb"
| 4 || April 4 || Astros || 4 – 3 || Wright (1-0) || Lieber (0-1) || Valverde (1) || 37,812 || 1-3 || 
|- align="center" bgcolor="bbffbb" ||
| 5 || April 5 || Astros || 9 – 7 || Hart (1-0) || Oswalt (0-2) || Wood (2) || 40,707 || 2-3 || 
|- align="center" bgcolor="bbffbb" ||
| 6 || April 6 || Astros || 3 – 2 || Zambrano (1-0) || Villarreal (0-2) || Wood (3) || 40,929 || 3-3 || 
|- align="center" bgcolor="bbffbb" ||
| 7 || April 7 || @ Pirates || 10 – 8 (12) || Lieber (1-1) || Meek (0-1) || Mármol (1) || 37,491 || 4-3 || 
|- align="center"  bgcolor="bbffbb" ||
| 8 || April 9 || @ Pirates || 6 – 4 (15) || Hart (2-0) || Dumatrait (0-1) || Marshall (1) || 9,735 || 5-3 || 
|- align="center"  bgcolor="bbffbb" ||
| 9 || April 10 || @ Pirates || 7 – 3 || Lieber (2-1) || Morris (0-1) || || 9,798 || 6-3 || 
|- align="center" bgcolor="ffbbbb"
| 10 || April 11 || @ Phillies || 5 – 3 || Myers (1-1) || Zambrano (1-1) || Lidge (2) || 37,368 || 6-4 || 
|- align="center" bgcolor="ffbbbb"
| 11 || April 12 || @ Phillies || 7 – 1 || Hamels (2-1) || Lilly (0-2) || || 45,072 || 6-5 || 
|- align="center" bgcolor="bbffbb"
| 12 || April 13 || @ Phillies || 6 – 5 (10) || Wood (1-0) || Seánez (0-1) || Howry (1) || 40,095 || 7-5 || 
|- align="center" bgcolor="bbffbb"
| 13 || April 15 || Reds || 9 – 5 || Dempster (2-0) || Harang (1-2) || || 39,130 || 8-5 || 
|- align="center" bgcolor="bbffbb"
| 14 || April 16 || Reds || 12 – 3 || Zambrano (2-1) || Fogg (1-2) || || 40,099 || 9-5 || 
|- align="center" bgcolor="ffbbbb"
| 15 || April 17 || Reds || 9 – 2 || Vólquez (2-0) || Lilly (0-3) || || 39,534 || 9-6 || 
|- align="center" bgcolor="bbffbb"
| 16 || April 18 || Pirates || 3 – 2 || Hill (1-0) || Snell (2-1) || Wood (4) || 39,118 || 10-6 || 
|- align="center" bgcolor="bbffbb"
| 17 || April 19 || Pirates || 13 – 1 || Marquis (1-0) || Gorzelanny (1-2) || || 40,298 || 11-6 || 
|- align="center" bgcolor="bbffbb"
| 18 || April 20 || Pirates || 13 – 6 || Dempster (3-0) || Duke (0-1) || || 41,405 || 12-6 || 
|- align="center" bgcolor="bbffbb"
| 19 || April 21 || Mets || 7 – 1 || Zambrano (3-1) || Maine (1-2) || || 40,582 || 13-6 || 
|- align="center" bgcolor="bbffbb"
| 20 || April 22 || Mets || 8 – 1 || Lilly (1-3) || Figueroa (1-1) || || 40,503 || 14-6 || 
|- align="center" bgcolor="bbffbb"
| 21 || April 23 || @ Rockies || 7 – 6 (10) || Wood (2-0) || Wells (1-1) || Mármol (2) || 36,864 || 15-6 || 
|- align="center" bgcolor="ffbbbb"
| 22 || April 24 || @ Rockies || 4 – 2 || Cook (3-1) || Hart (2-1) || Fuentes (1) || 32,791 || 15-7 || 
|- align="center" bgcolor="ffbbbb"
| 23 || April 25 || @ Nationals || 5 – 3 || Rauch (2-0) || Howry (0-2) || || 35,154 || 15-8 || 
|- align="center" bgcolor="bbffbb"
| 24 || April 26 || @ Nationals || 7 – 0 || Zambrano (4-1) || Chico (0-5) || || 35,188 || 16-8 || 
|- align="center" bgcolor="ffbbbb"
| 25 || April 27 || @ Nationals || 2 – 0 || Lannan (2-2) || Lilly (1-4) || Rauch (4) || 33,795 || 16-9 || 
|- align="center" bgcolor="ffbbbb"
| 26 || April 29 || Brewers || 10 – 7 || Sheets (4-0) ||  Marquis (1-1) || Gagné (8) || 39,543 || 16-10 || 
|- align="center" bgcolor="bbffbb"
| 27 || April 30 || Brewers || 19 – 5 || Dempster (4-0) || Suppan (1-1) || || 39,908 || 17-10 || 
|-

|- align="center" bgcolor="ffbbbb"
| 28 || May 1 || Brewers || 4 – 3 || Shouse (2-0) || Wood (2-1) || Gagné (9) || 40,849 || 17-11 || 
|- align="center" bgcolor="ffbbbb"
| 29 || May 2 || @ Cardinals || 5 – 3 (11) || Villone (1-0) || Fox (0-1) || || 45,077 || 17-12 || 
|- align="center" bgcolor="bbffbb"
| 30 || May 3 || @ Cardinals || 9 – 3 || Lilly (2-4) || Lohse (3-1) || || 46,792 || 18-12 || 
|- align="center" bgcolor="ffbbbb"
| 31 || May 4 || @ Cardinals || 5 – 3 || Wellemeyer (3-1) || Marquis (1-2) || Isringhausen (10) || 44,969 || 18-13 || 
|- align="center" bgcolor="ffbbbb"
| 32 || May 5 || @ Reds || 5 – 3 || Cueto (2-3) || Dempster (4-1) || Cordero (5) || 20,289 || 18-14 || 
|- align="center" bgcolor="bbffbb"
| 33 || May 6 || @ Reds || 3 – 0 ||Zambrano (5-1) || Harang (1-5) || Wood (5) || 21,153 || 19-14 || 
|- align="center" bgcolor="ffbbbb"
| 34 || May 7 || @ Reds || 9 – 0 || Vólquez (5-1) || Lieber (2-2) || || 28,418 || 19-15 || 
|- align="center" bgcolor="bbffbb"
| 35 || May 9 || D-backs || 3 – 1 ||Lilly (3-4) || Haren (4-2) || Wood (6) || 40,236 || 20-15 || 
|- align="center" bgcolor="bbffbb"
| 36 || May 10 || D-backs || 7 – 2 || Eyre (1-0) || Qualls (0-4) || || 41,597 || 21-15 || 
|- align="center" bgcolor="bbffbb"
| 37 || May 11 || D-backs || 6 – 4  || Mármol (1-0) || Peña (0-1)  || Wood (7) || 39,740 || 22-15 || 
|- align="center" bgcolor="bbffbb"
| 38 || May 12 || Padres || 12 – 3 || Zambrano (6-1) || Wolf (2-3) || || 39,528 || 23-15 || 
|- align="center" bgcolor="ffbbbb"
| 39 || May 13 || Padres || 4 – 3 || Estes (1-0) || Marquis (1-3) || Hoffman (7) || 40,028 || 23-16 || 
|- align="center" bgcolor="bbffbb"
| 40 || May 14 || Padres || 8 – 5 || Lilly (4-4) || Peavy (4-3) || || 39,650 || 24-16 ||  
|- align="center" bgcolor="bbffbb"
| 41 || May 15 || Padres || 4 – 0 || Dempster (5-1) || Maddux (3-4) || Wood (8) || 40,629 || 25-16 || 
|- align="center" bgcolor="bbffbb"
| 42 || May 16 || Pirates || 7 – 4  || Gallagher (1-0) || Gorzelanny (3-4)  || Wood (9) || 40,537  || 26-16 || 
|- align="center" bgcolor="ffbbbb"
| 43 || May 17 || Pirates || 7 – 6 || Marte (3-0) || Mármol (1-1) || Capps (10) || 41,686 || 26-17 || 
|- align="center" bgcolor="bbffbb"
| 44 || May 18 || Pirates || 4 – 3 || Marquis (2-3) || Dumatrait (1-2) || Wood (10)|| 41,321 || 27-17 || 
|- align="center" bgcolor="bbffbb"
| 45 || May 19 || @ Astros || 7 – 2 || Lilly (5-4) || Moehler (1-1) || || 32,458 || 28-17 || 
|- align="center" bgcolor="ffbbbb"
| 46 || May 20 || @ Astros || 4 – 2 || Sampson (3-3) || Dempster (5-2) || Valverde (13) || 33,339 || 28-18 || 
|- align="center"  bgcolor="ffbbbb"
| 47 || May 21 || @ Astros || 5 – 3 || Chacón (0-1) || Gallagher (1-1) || Valverde (14) || 33,251 || 28-19 || 
|- align="center" bgcolor="bbffbb"
| 48 || May 23 || @ Pirates || 12 – 3 || Zambrano (7-1)|| Duke (2-3) || || 32,656 || 29-19 || 
|- align="center" bgcolor="ffbbbb"
| 49 || May 24 || @ Pirates || 5 – 4 (14) || Grabow (4-1) || Wuertz (0-1) || || 29,929 || 29-20 || 
|- align="center" bgcolor="ffbbbb"
| 50 || May 25 || @ Pirates || 6 – 5 (11) || Marte (4-0) || Lieber (2-3) || || 29,415 || 29-21 || 
|- align="center" bgcolor="bbffbb"
| 51 || May 26 || Dodgers || 3 – 1 || Dempster (6-2) || Billingsley (4-6) || Wood (11) || 41,583 || 30-21 || 
|- align="center" bgcolor="bbffbb"
| 52 || May 27 || Dodgers || 3 – 1 || Gallagher (2-1) || Kuroda (2-4) || Wood (12) || 39,894 || 31-21 || 
|- align="center" bgcolor="bbffbb"
| 53 || May 28 || Dodgers || 2 – 1 (10) || Howry (1-2) || Park (1-1) || || 39,945 || 32-21 || 
|- align="center" bgcolor="bbffbb"
| 54 || May 29 || Rockies || 8 – 4 || Wuertz (1-1) || Herges (2-2) || || 39,851 || 33-21 || 
|- align="center" bgcolor="bbffbb"
| 55 || May 30 || Rockies || 10 – 9 || Eyre (2-0) || Corpas (0-3) || Wood (13) || 39,686 || 34-21 || 
|- align="center" bgcolor="bbffbb"
| 56 || May 31 || Rockies || 5 – 4 || Dempster (7-2) || Rusch (1-3) || Mármol (3) || 41,529 || 35-21 || 
|-

|- align="center" bgcolor="bbffbb"
| 57 || June 1 || Rockies || 5 – 3 || Gallagher (3-1) || Jiménez (1-6) || Wood (14) || 41,730 || 36-21 || 
|- align="center" bgcolor="bbffbb"
| 58 || June 2 || @ Padres || 7 – 6 || Zambrano (8-1) || Baek (0-2) || Wood (15) || 30,259 || 37-21 || 
|- align="center" bgcolor="bbffbb"
| 59 || June 3 || @ Padres || 9 – 6 || Marquis  (3-3) || Corey (1-1) || Wood (16) || 24,477 || 38-21 || 
|- align="center" bgcolor="ffbbbb"
| 60 || June 4 || @ Padres || 2 – 1 || Bell (3-3) || Lilly (5-5) || Hoffman (12) || 25,258 || 38-22 || 
|- align="center" bgcolor="bbffbb"
| 61 || June 5 || @ Dodgers || 5 – 4 || Howry (2-2) || Saito (3-2) || Wood (17) || 44,988 || 39-22 || 
|- align="center" bgcolor="ffbbbb"
| 62 || June 6 || @ Dodgers || 3 – 0 || Kuroda (3-5) || Gallagher (3-2) || || 52,484 || 39-23 || 
|- align="center" bgcolor="ffbbbb"
| 63 || June 7 || @ Dodgers || 7 – 3 || Lowe (4-5) || Zambrano (8-2) || || 50,020 || 39-24 || 
|- align="center" bgcolor="bbffbb"
| 64 || June 8 || @ Dodgers || 3 – 1 || Marquis (4-3) || Penny (5-8) || Wood (18) || 49,994 || 40-24 || 
|- align="center" bgcolor="bbffbb"
| 65 || June 10 || Braves || 10 – 5 || Lilly (6-5) || Glavine (2-3) || || 41,624 || 41-24 || 
|- align="center" bgcolor="bbffbb"
| 66 || June 11 || Braves || 7 – 2 || Dempster (8-2)|| Bennett (0-4) || || 41,497 || 42-24 || 
|- align="center" bgcolor="bbffbb"
| 67 || June 12 || Braves || 3 – 2 (11)  || Wood (3-1)  || Acosta (3-5) || || 41,517 || 43-24 ||  
|- align="center" bgcolor="ffbbbb"
| 68 || June 13 || @ Blue Jays || 3 – 2 || Burnett (6-6) || Gallagher (3-3) || Ryan (14)|| 27,803 || 43-25 || 
|- align="center" bgcolor="bbffbb"
| 69 || June 14 || @ Blue Jays || 6 – 2 || Marquis (5-3)|| Halladay (8-6) || || 34,048 || 44-25 || 
|- align="center" bgcolor="bbffbb"
| 70 || June 15 || @ Blue Jays || 7 – 4 || Lilly (7-5) || Litsch (7-3) || || 40,738 || 45-25 || 
|- align="center" bgcolor="ffbbbb"
| 71 || June 17 || @ Rays || 3 -2 || Balfour (1-0) || Cotts (0-1) || Percival (16) || 31,607 || 45-26 || 
|- align="center" bgcolor="ffbbbb"
| 72 || June 18 || @ Rays || 5 – 4 || Sonnanstine (8-3) || Zambrano (8-3) || Percival (17) || 31,496 || 45-27 || 
|- align="center" bgcolor="ffbbbb"
| 73 || June 19 || @ Rays || 8 – 3 || Balfour (2-0) || Mármol (1-2) || || 34,441 || 45-28 || 
|- align="center" bgcolor="bbffbb"
| 74 || June 20 || White Sox || 4 – 3 || Wood (4-1) || Linebrink (2-2) || || 41,106 || 46-28 || 
|- align="center" bgcolor="bbffbb"
| 75 || June 21 || White Sox || 11 – 7 || Marquis (6-3) || Contreras (6-6) || Wood (19) || 41,021 || 47-28 || 
|- align="center" bgcolor="bbffbb"
| 76 || June 22 || White Sox || 7 – 1 || Dempster (9-2) || Vázquez (7-6) || || 41,034 || 48-28 || 
|- align="center" bgcolor="ffbbbb"
| 77 || June 24 || Orioles || 7 – 5 || Guthrie (4-7) || Marshall (0-1) || Sherrill (26) || 41,357 || 48-29 || 
|- align="center" bgcolor=bbffbb
| 78 || June 25 || Orioles || 7 – 4 || Lilly (8-5) || Albers (3-3) || Wood (20) || 40,754 || 49-29 || 
|- align="center" bgcolor="ffbbbb"
| 79 || June 26 || Orioles || 11 – 4 || Liz (2-0) || Marquis (6-4) || || 41,670 || 49-30 || 
|- align="center" bgcolor="ffbbbb"
| 80 || June 27 || @ White Sox || 10 – 3 || Contreras (7-6) || Dempster (9-3) || || 39,132 || 49-31 || 
|- align="center" bgcolor="ffbbbb"
| 81 || June 28 || @ White Sox || 6 – 5  || Thornton (4-1) || Mármol (1-3) || Jenks (18) || 39,143 || 49-32 || 
|- align="center" bgcolor="ffbbbb"
| 82 || June 29 || @ White Sox || 5 – 1 || Buehrle (6-6) || Marshall (0-2) || || 39,573 || 49-33 || 
|- align="center" bgcolor="bbffbb"
| 83 || June 30 || @ Giants || 9 – 2 || Lilly (9-5)|| Zito (3-12) || || 35,311 || 50-33 || 
|-

|- align="center" bgcolor="ffbbbb"
| 84 || July 1 || @ Giants || 2 – 1 || Cain (5-6) || Marquis (6-5) || Wilson (23)|| 33,858 || 50-34 || 
|- align="center" bgcolor="bbffbb"
| 85 || July 2 || @ Giants || 6 – 5 || Mármol (2-3) || Walker (3-4) || Wood (21) || 41,345 || 51-34 || 
|- align="center" bgcolor="ffbbbb"
| 86 || July 3 || @ Giants || 8 – 3 || Lincecum (10-1) || Gallagher (3-4) || || 40,511 || 51-35 || 
|- align="center" bgcolor="bbffbb"
| 87 || July 4 || @ Cardinals || 2 – 1 || Zambrano (9-3) || Looper (9-6)|| Wood (22) || 46,450 || 52-35 ||
|- align="center" bgcolor="ffbbbb"
| 88 || July 5 || @ Cardinals || 5 – 4 || McClellan (1-3) || Wood (4-2) || || 46,865 || 52-36 || 
|- align="center" bgcolor="bbffbb"
| 89 || July 6 || @ Cardinals || 7 – 1 || Marshall (1-2) || Wellemeyer (7-4) || || 46,752 || 53-36 || 
|- align="center" bgcolor="bbffbb"
| 90 || July 8 || Reds || 7 – 3 || Dempster (10-3) || Harang (3-11) || || 41,360 || 54-36 ||
|- align="center" bgcolor="bbffbb"
| 91 || July 9 || Reds || 5 – 1 || Zambrano (10-3) || Cueto (7-9) || Wood (23) || 41,605 || 55-36 || 
|- align="center" bgcolor="ffbbbb"
| 92 || July 10 || Reds || 12 – 7 || Arroyo (7-7) || Lilly (9-6) || || 41,459 || 55-37 || 
|- align="center" bgcolor="bbffbb"
| 93 || July 11 || Giants || 3 – 1 || Howry (3-2) || Walker (3-5) || Wood (24) || 41,605 || 56-37 || 
|- align="center" bgcolor="bbffbb"
| 94 || July 12 || Giants || 8 – 7 (11) || Marshall (2-2) || Wilson (0-2) || || 41,555 || 57-37 || 
|- align="center" bgcolor="ffbbbb"
| 95 || July 13 || Giants || 4 – 2 || Lincecum (11-2) || Dempster (10-4) || Wilson (25) || 41,574 || 57-38 || 
|- align="center"  bgcolor="ffbbbb"
| 96 || July 18 || @ Astros || 2 – 1 || Geary (2-1) || Howry (3-3) ||  || 42,368 || 57-39 || 
|- align="center" bgcolor="ffbbbb"
| 97 || July 19 || @ Astros || 4 – 1 || Rodríguez (5-3) || Zambrano (10-4) || Valverde (25) || 43,129 || 57-40 || 
|- align="center" bgcolor="bbffbb"
| 98 || July 20 || @ Astros || 9 – 0 || Dempster (11-4) || Backe (6-10) || || 41,461 || 58-40 || 
|- align="center" bgcolor="ffbbbb"
| 99 || July 21 || @ D-backs || 2 – 0 || Johnson (7-7) || Harden (5-2) || Qualls (2) || 34,627 || 58-41 || 
|- align="center" bgcolor="ffbbbb"
| 100 || July 22 || @ D-backs || 9 – 2 || Petit (1-1) || Marquis (6-6) || || 35,337 || 58-42 || 
|- align="center" bgcolor="bbffbb"
| 101 || July 23 || @ D-backs || 10 – 6 || Lilly (10-6) || Davis (3-5) || || 37,301 || 59-42 || 
|- align="center" bgcolor="bbffbb"
| 102 || July 24 || Marlins || 6 – 3 || Zambrano (11-4) || Olsen (6-5) || Mármol (4) || 41,482 || 60-42 || 
|- align="center" bgcolor="ffbbbb"
| 103 || July 25 || Marlins || 3 – 2 || Miller (3-2) || Howry (3-4) || Gregg (21) || 41,570 || 60-43 || 
|- align="center" bgcolor="ffbbbb"
| 104 || July 26 || Marlins || 3 – 2 (12) || Miller (4-2) || Gaudin (5-4) || Gregg (22) || 41,471 || 60-44 || 
|- align="center" bgcolor="bbffbb"
| 105 || July 27 || Marlins || 9 – 6 || Gaudin (6-4) || Hendrickson (7-8) || Samardzija (1) || 41,017 || 61-44 || 
|- align="center" bgcolor="bbffbb"
| 106 || July 28 || @ Brewers || 6 – 4 || Gaudin (7-4) || Torres (5-3) || Mármol (5) || 45,311 || 62-44 || 
|- align="center" bgcolor="bbffbb"
| 107 || July 29 || @ Brewers || 7 – 1 || Zambrano (12-4) || Sheets (10-4) || || 45,069 || 63-44 || 
|- align="center" bgcolor="bbffbb"
| 108 || July 30 || @ Brewers || 7 – 2 || Dempster (12-4) || Parra (9-4) || || 44,871 || 64-44 || 
|- align="center" bgcolor="bbffbb"
| 109 || July 31 || @ Brewers || 11 – 4 || Harden (6-2) || Bush (5-9) || || 45,346 || 65-44 || 
|-

|- align="center" bgcolor="ffbbbb"
| 110 || August 1 || Pirates || 3 – 0 || Karstens (1-0) || Marquis (6-7) || Grabow (1) || 41,340 || 65-45 || 
|- align="center" bgcolor="bbffbb"
| 111 || August 2 || Pirates || 5 – 1 || Lilly (11-6) || Maholm (7-7) || || 41,426 || 66-45 || 
|- align="center" bgcolor="bbffbb"
| 112 || August 3 || Pirates || 8 – 5 || Gaudin (8-4) || Hansen (1-4) || Mármol (6) || 41,200 || 67-45 || 
|- align="center" bgcolor="ffbbbb"
| 113 || August 4 || Astros || 2 – 0  (8)|| Moehler (7-4) || Dempster (12-5) || Hawkins (1) || 40,867 || 67-46 || 
|- align="center" bgcolor="bbffbb"
| 114 || August 5 || Astros || 11 – 7 || Howry (4-4) || Sampson (5-4) || || 40,416 || 68-46 || 
|- align="center" bgcolor="bbffbb"
| 115 || August 6 || Astros || 11 – 4 || Marquis (7-7) || Backe (6-11) || || 41,107 || 69-46 || 
|- align="center" bgcolor="bbffbb"
| 116 || August 8 || Cardinals || 3 – 2 (11) || Howry (5-4) || Franklin (4-5)  || || 41,539 || 70-46 ||
|- align="center" bgcolor="ffbbbb"
| 117 || August 9 || Cardinals || 12 – 3 || Wellemeyer (9-4) || Zambrano (12-5) || || 41,436 || 70-47|| 
|- align="center" bgcolor="bbffbb"
| 118 || August 10 || Cardinals || 6 – 2 || Dempster (13-5) || Carpenter (0-1) || || 41,268 || 71-47 || 
|- align="center" bgcolor="bbbbbb"
| -- || August 12 || @ Braves || colspan=7|Postponed (rain) Rescheduled for August 13
|- align="center" bgcolor="bbffbb"
| 119 || August 13 || @ Braves || 10 – 2 || Marquis (8-7) || Morton (3-6) || || 27,220 || 72-47 || 
|- align="center" bgcolor="bbffbb"
| 120 || August 13 || @ Braves || 8 – 0  || Harden (7-2) || Campillo (7-5) || || 33,714 || 73-47 || 
|- align="center" bgcolor="bbffbb"
| 121 || August 14 || @ Braves ||11 – 7 || Lilly (12-6) || Glavine (2-4) || || 36,365 || 74-47 ||  
|- align="center" bgcolor="bbffbb"
| 122 || August 15 || @ Marlins || 6 – 5 || Gaudin (9-4) || Gregg (6-5) || Wood (25) || 28,163 || 75-47 || 
|- align="center" bgcolor="ffbbbb"
| 123 || August 16 || @ Marlins || 2 – 1 || Sánchez (2-2) || Marshall (2-3) || Gregg (27) || 39,124 || 75-48 || 
|- align="center" bgcolor="bbffbb"
| 124 || August 17 || @ Marlins || 9 – 2 || Dempster (14-5) || Pinto (2-5) || || 19,085 || 76-48 || 
|- align="center" bgcolor="bbffbb"
| 125 || August 19 || Reds || 5 – 0 || Harden (8-2) || Cueto (8-12) || || 41,208 || 77-48 || 
|- align="center" bgcolor="ffbbbb"
| 126 || August 20 || Reds || 2 – 1 || Arroyo (11-10) || Lilly (12-7) || Cordero (24) || 40,509 || 77-49 || 
|- align="center" bgcolor="bbffbb"
| 127 || August 21 || Reds || 3 – 2 || Zambrano (13-5) || Fogg (2-6) || Wood (26) || 40,370 || 78-49 || 
|- align="center" bgcolor="ffbbbb"
| 128 || August 22 || Nationals || 13 – 5 || Lannan (7-12) || Cotts (0-2) || || 40,513 || 78-50 || 
|- align="center" bgcolor="bbffbb"
| 129 || August 23 || Nationals || 9 – 2 || Dempster (15-5) || Pérez (5-10) || || 40,708 || 79-50 || 
|- align="center" bgcolor="bbffbb"
| 130 || August 24 || Nationals || 6 – 1 || Harden (9-2) || Bergmann (2-10) || || 40,682 || 80-50 || 
|- align="center" bgcolor="bbffbb"
| 131 || August 25 || @ Pirates || 12 – 3 || Lilly (13-7) || Karstens (2-3) || || 14,454 || 81-50 || 
|- align="center" bgcolor="bbffbb"
| 132 || August 26 || @ Pirates || 14 – 9 || Marshall (3-3) || Hansen (1-5) || || 17,929 || 82-50 || 
|- align="center" bgcolor="bbffbb"
| 133 || August 27 || @ Pirates || 2 – 0 || Marquis (9-7) || Duke (4-13) || Wood (27) || 15,260 || 83-50 || 
|- align="center" bgcolor="bbffbb"
| 134 || August 28 || Phillies || 6 – 4 || Howry (6-4) || Durbin (5-3) || Wood (28) || 40,362 || 84-50 || 
|- align="center" bgcolor="bbffbb"
| 135 || August 29 || Phillies || 3 – 2 || Samardzija (1-0) || Condrey (3-4) || Mármol (7) || 40,844 || 85-50 || 
|- align="center" bgcolor="ffbbbb"
| 136 || August 30 || Phillies || 5 – 2 || Myers (8-10) || Lilly (13-8) || Lidge (32) || 41,511 || 85-51 || 
|- align="center" bgcolor="ffbbbb"
| 137 || August 31 || Phillies || 5 – 3 || Moyer (12-7) || Marshall (3-4) || Lidge (33) || 41,544 || 85-52 || 
|-

|- align="center" bgcolor="ffbbbb"
| 138 || September 1 || Astros || 3 – 0 || Oswalt (13-9) || Marquis (9-8) || Valverde (38) || 40,670 || 85-53 || 
|- align="center" bgcolor="ffbbbb"
| 139 || September 2 || Astros || 9 – 7 (11) || Wright (4-3) || Wood (4-3) || Valverde (39) || 39,846 || 85-54 || 
|- align="center" bgcolor="ffbbbb"
| 140 || September 3 || Astros || 4 – 0 || Wolf (9-11) || Dempster (15-6) || || 40,163 || 85-55 || 
|- align="center" bgcolor="ffbbbb"
| 141 || September 5 || @ Reds || 10 – 2 || Arroyo (14-10) || Lilly (13-9) || || 31,213 || 85-56 || 
|- align="center" bgcolor="bbffbb"
| 142 || September 6 || @ Reds || 14 – 9 || Marquis (10-8) || Cueto (8-13) || || 41,204 || 86-56 || 
|- align="center" bgcolor="ffbbbb"
| 143 || September 7 || @ Reds || 4 – 3 || Cordero (5-4) || Wood (4-4) || || 37,540 || 86-57 || 
|- align="center" bgcolor="ffbbbb"
| 144 || September 9 || @ Cardinals || 4 – 3 || Perez (3-2) || Mármol (2-4) || || 43,806 || 86-58 || 
|- align="center" bgcolor="bbffbb"
| 145 || September 10 || @ Cardinals || 4 – 3 || Lilly (14-9) || Looper (12-12) || Wood (29) || 43,955 || 87-58 || 
|- align="center" bgcolor="bbffbb"
| 146 || September 11 || @ Cardinals || 3 – 2 || Harden (9-2) || Wellemeyer (12-7) || Wood (30) || 44,155 || 88-58 || 
|- align="center" bgcolor="bbbbbb"
| -- || September 12 || @ Astros || Colspan=7|Postponed (Hurricane Ike) Rescheduled for September 15 @ Milwaukee
|- align="center" bgcolor="bbbbbb"
| -- || September 13 || @ Astros || Colspan=7|Postponed (Hurricane Ike) Rescheduled for September 29, if necessary
|- align="center" bgcolor="bbffbb"
| 147 || September 14 || @ Astrosat Miller Park || 5 – 0 || Zambrano (14-5) || Wolf (10-12) || || 23,441 || 89-58 || 
|- align="center" bgcolor="bbffbb"
| 148 || September 15 || @ Astrosat Miller Park || 6 – 1 || Lilly (15-9) || Moehler (11-7) || || 15,158 || 90-58 || 
|- align="center" bgcolor="bbffbb"
| 149 || September 16 || Brewers || 5 – 4 || Dempster (16-6) || Sabathia (15-8) || Wood (31) || 40,738 || 91-58 || 
|- align="center" bgcolor="ffbbbb"
| 150 || September 17 || Brewers || 6 – 2 || DiFelice (1-0) || Marquis (10-9) || || 41,200 || 91-59 || 
|- align="center" bgcolor="bbffbb"
| 151 || September 18 || Brewers || 7 – 6 || Wood (5-4) || Villanueva (4-7) || || 40,678 || 92-59 || 
|- align="center" bgcolor="ffbbbb"
| 152 || September 19 || Cardinals || 12 – 6 || Wainwright (10-3) || Zambrano (14-6) || || 40,972 || 92-60 || 
|- align="center" bgcolor="bbffbb"
| 153 || September 20 || Cardinals || 5 – 4 || Lilly (16-9) || Piñeiro (6-7) || Wood (32) || 41,597 || 93-60 || 
|- align="center" bgcolor="bbffbb"
| 154 || September 21 || Cardinals || 5 – 1 || Dempster (17-6) || Looper (12-14) || || 40,551 || 94-60 || 
|- align="center" bgcolor="bbffbb"
| 155 || September 22 || @ Mets || 9 – 5 || Marquis (11-9) || Niese (1-1) || Wood (33) || 51,137 || 95-60 || 
|- align="center" bgcolor="ffbbbb"
| 156 || September 23 || @ Mets || 6 – 2 || Santana (15-7) || Gaudin (9-5) || Ayala (9) || 50,615 || 95-61 || 
|- align="center" bgcolor="bbffbb"
| 157 || September 24 || @ Mets || 9 – 6 || Howry (7-4) || Ayala (2-10) || Wood (34) || 54,416 || 96-61 || 
|- align="center" bgcolor="ffbbbb"
| 158 || September 25 || @ Mets || 7 – 6 || Smith (6-3) || Hart (2-2) || || 51,174 || 96-62 || 
|- align="center" bgcolor="ffbbbb"
| 159 || September 26 || @ Brewers || 5 – 1 || McClung (6-6) || Marshall (3-5) || || 44,084 || 96-63 || 
|- align="center" bgcolor="bbffbb"
| 160 || September 27 || @ Brewers || 7 – 3 || Lilly (17-9) || Sheets (13-9) || || 45,288 || 97-63 || 
|- align="center" bgcolor="ffbbbb"
| 161 || September 28 || @ Brewers || 3 – 1 || Sabathia (17-10) || Howry (7-5) || || 45,299 || 97-64 || 
|- align="center" bgcolor="bbbbbb"
| 162 || September 29 || @ Astros || Colspan=7|Cancelled due to the Astros being eliminated from playoff contention.
|-

|- style="text-align:center;"
| Legend:       = Win       = Loss       = Postponement/CancellationBold = Cubs team member

Season standings

National League Central

Record vs. opponents

Rally songs 
In 2007, Ernie Banks had requested that Evanston, Illinois native Eddie Vedder write the Cubs a song, and in August 2008 Vedder recorded "All the Way", which was released on September 18, 2008. During the season, a new version of "Go, Cubs, Go" was recorded and released by the Manic Sewing Circle, although the original 1984 Steve Goodman version became the official Cubs victory song.

Playoffs

NLDS vs. Los Angeles Dodgers 

The Chicago Cubs were eliminated from the playoffs after Los Angeles won the series, 3-0.

Game 1, October 1 
Wrigley Field in Chicago

Game 2, October 2 
Wrigley Field in Chicago

Game 3, October 4 
Dodger Stadium in Los Angeles

The Cubs' Game 3 loss to the Dodgers marked the franchise's ninth consecutive post-season defeat, dating back to the 2003 NLCS.

Roster

Player stats

Batting 
Note: G = Games played; AB = At bats; H = Hits; Avg. = Batting average; HR = Home runs; RBI = Runs batted in

Pitching 
Note: W = Wins; L = Losses; ERA = Earned run average; G = Games pitched; GS = Games started; SV = Saves; IP = Innings pitched; R = Runs allowed; ER = Earned runs allowed; BB = Walks allowed; K = Strikeouts

2007 post-season changes

Trades

Free agent acquisitions

Players lost to free agency

Other news 
 On November 20, 2007, John McDonough stepped down as team president to join the Chicago Blackhawks.
 On April 23, 2008, the Chicago Cubs recorded their 10,000th victory in franchise history with a 7-6 victory in 10 innings over the Colorado Rockies. They were just the second team to complete this feat behind the San Francisco Giants.
 On September 14, 2008 Carlos Zambrano threw the first no-hitter for the Cubs since Milt Pappas threw his on September 2, 1972. Zambrano threw the no-hitter against the Houston Astros in a game played at Miller Park in Milwaukee. It was the first no-hitter recorded at a neutral site in baseball history. The game was moved due to the damage Hurricane Ike caused.

Farm system 

LEAGUE CHAMPIONS: Daytona

References 
 Chicago Cubs season at Baseball Reference

External links 

 Chicago Cubs clinch NL Central (Video)

Chicago Cubs seasons
Chicago Cubs
National League Central champion seasons
Cub